Peyton Leigh Perea (born March 28, 1997) is an American professional soccer player who plays as a midfielder for Scottish Women's Premier League club Glasgow City. She has previously played for North Carolina Courage of the National Women's Soccer League (NWSL).

Club career
Perea made her NWSL debut for North Carolina Courage on September 12, 2020.

She signed for Scottish club Glasgow City in January 2022.

References

External links
 
 Wake Forest profile

1997 births
Living people
American women's soccer players
Women's association football midfielders
Wake Forest Demon Deacons women's soccer players
North Carolina Courage players
Santa Teresa CD players
American expatriate women's soccer players
American expatriate sportspeople in Spain
Expatriate women's footballers in Spain
American sportspeople of Colombian descent
National Women's Soccer League players
American expatriate sportspeople in Scotland
Expatriate women's footballers in Scotland
Glasgow City F.C. players